Destruction Derby 64 is a vehicular combat racing video game developed by Looking Glass Studios and published by THQ, under license from Psygnosis. it's the third installment in the Destruction Derby series, released on 30 September 1999 in North America and 12 October 1999 in Europe exclusively for the Nintendo 64. It's also the only Destruction Derby game not to be developed in the UK.

Gameplay
Destruction Derby 64 features brighter graphics and a larger variety of content compared to PlayStation's Destruction Derby 2. There is a set of eight tracks and four bowls, all in various different environments. They are reasonably detailed, although the texture detail suffers due to the Nintendo 64's smaller texture memory. The game is set further apart with its very distinct racing system.

Race events in Destruction Derby 64 have a particular focus on head-on collisions. Uniquely in this game, in a race, drivers are split into two or three groups, each starting at a different part of the track. The one or two group(s) opposing the player's race reversed, meaning they will drive towards the player's group which allows for head-on collisions to be executed. There are 12 drivers in any single player event (thus 11 opponents).

There is notably also no lapping system in race events, with races only finished when the all opponents have been wrecked or the player itself has. An arcade-style checkpoint and timer has also been introduced. There is much emphasis on gripping opponents, which is also encouraged to the player by the commentator. It's the combination of these points that determine the winner in race events.

One notable change is that the World Championship, which is the main career mode, does not use a 'division' system like the previous games. Instead it relies on four different difficulty levels: Novice, Amateur, Professional and Legend - each of which has a higher number of events to complete. The player initially starts out at the Novice level circuit, which then has to be completed before the Amateur circuit is unlocked. In addition, Destruction Derby 64 does not have a set of different competitor characters.

Points system
Up to 100 points for a collision
20 points for gripping
20 points for going through a checkpoint

Points from a checkpoint determine the racing achievement of the player, and the collision points are for the wrecking part, which are added up as total.

Capture The Flag has its own points rules.

Development
Destruction Derby 64 started development around April 1998 as reported by British magazine Computer and Video Games, claiming that Psygnosis (a division of Sony Computer Entertainment) was working on a Destruction Derby title for Nintendo 64 along with O.D.T. and Formula 1 98, and coming a week after the announcement of Wipeout 64.

Although by the end of the year these games were released (N64 versions of O.D.T. and Formula 1 98 were cancelled), Destruction Derby 64 was still far from ready. It took time until Psygnosis managed to grant THQ the Nintendo exclusive to publish it under license. Looking Glass Studios took development duties, a developer that achieved popularity at the time for its critically acclaimed PC game Thief: The Dark Project. DD64 was developed at the Intermetrics (which owned Looking Glass Studio) studio in Redmond, Washington State, USA. The game finally arrived after some 18 months time in late 1999.

Reception

Destruction Derby 64 received a mixed-to-positive reception. Jeff Gerstmann of GameSpot wrote, "Graphically, Destruction Derby 64 surpasses the old PlayStation games by quite a bit - not that that is a particularly hard thing to do". He found that its framerate was adequate even in split-screen mode, and concluded that it was "a better game than its PlayStation counterparts". He finished, "Give it a rent next time you're rounding up the posse for a day of gaming." GameFan's Levi Buchanan praised it as "the best racer for the Nintendo 64 this year", and he lauded its "simplistic control" as a remedy for the complex controls that he believed had "ruined the PlayStation versions". He liked its graphics but wrote that its music "isn't too hot". Buchanan enjoyed its multiplayer component and wrote that "the slowdown when all four join in is minima[l]—nice programming on the part of Looking Glass". Although he complained that the game's vehicle damage is not "segmented throughout your car", he concluded by calling the game "pure, unadulterated fun [that] has enough tracks and hidden vehicles to keep you playing for a very long time".

Tim Weaver from the British N64 Magazine praised the derby bowls and the multiplayer options, calling the Bomb Tag mode "absolutely fantastic". But he felt that the one-player mode was "short-lived" and that it becomes "boring". Weaver also noted the "shocking" framerate problems and criticised the car designs, comparing them to a cardboard boxes. Weaver called DD64 "three years out of date" and ended the review calling it "average".

References

External links
 
 Destruction Derby 64 at GameFAQs

1999 video games
Racing video games
Vehicular combat games
Looking Glass Studios games
Psygnosis games
THQ games
Nintendo 64 games
Nintendo 64-only games
Video games developed in the United States